Sir Peter Markham Scott,  (14 September 1909 – 29 August 1989) was a British ornithologist, conservationist, painter, naval officer, broadcaster and sportsman. The only child of Antarctic explorer Robert Falcon Scott, he took an interest in observing and shooting wildfowl at a young age and later took to their breeding.

He established the Wildfowl & Wetlands Trust in Slimbridge in 1946 and helped found the World Wide Fund for Nature, the logo of which he designed. He was a yachting enthusiast from an early age and took up gliding in mid-life. He was part of the UK team for the 1936 Summer Olympics and won a bronze medal in sailing. He was knighted in 1973 for his work in conservation of wild animals and was also a recipient of the WWF Gold Medal and the J. Paul Getty Prize.

Early life

Scott was born in London at 174, Buckingham Palace Road, the only child of Antarctic explorer Robert Falcon Scott and sculptor Kathleen Bruce. He was only two years old when his father died. Robert Scott, in a last letter to his wife, advised her to "make the boy interested in natural history if you can; it is better than games." He was named after Sir Clements Markham, mentor of Scott's polar expeditions, and a godfather along with J. M. Barrie, creator of Peter Pan.

His mother Lady Scott remarried in 1922. Her second husband Hilton Young (later Lord Kennet) became stepfather to Peter. In 1923, a half-brother, Wayland Young, was born.

Scott was educated at Oundle School and Trinity College, Cambridge, initially reading Natural Sciences but graduating in the History of Art in 1931. Whilst at Cambridge he shared digs with John Berry and the two shared many views.  As a student he was also an active member of the Cambridge University Cruising Club, sailing against Oxford in the 1929 and 1930 Varsity Matches. He studied art at the State Academy in Munich for a year followed by studies at the Royal Academy Schools, London.  One of the few non-wildlife paintings that he produced during his career, 'Dinghies Racing on Lake Ontario', is held by the Cambridge University Cruising Club.

Like his mother, he displayed a strong artistic talent and he became known as a painter of wildlife, particularly birds; he had his first exhibition in London in 1933. His wealthy background allowed him to follow his interests in art, wildlife and many sports, including wildfowling, sailing, gliding and ice skating. He represented Great Britain and Northern Ireland at sailing at the 1936 Summer Olympics, winning a bronze medal in the O-Jolle monotype class. He also participated in the Prince of Wales Cup in 1938 during which he and his crew on the Thunder and Lightning dinghy designed a modified wearable harness (now known as a trapeze) that helped them win.

Second World War

During the Second World War, Scott served in the Royal Navy Volunteer Reserve. As a Sub-Lieutenant, during the failed evacuation of the 51st Highland Division he was the British Naval officer sent ashore at Saint-Valery-en-Caux in the early hours of 11 June 1940 to evacuate some of the wounded. This was the last evacuation of British troops from the port area of St Valery that was not disrupted by enemy fire.

Then he served in destroyers in the North Atlantic but later moved to commanding the First (and only) Squadron of Steam Gun Boats against German E-boats in the English Channel.

Scott is credited with designing the Western Approaches ship camouflage scheme, which disguised the look of ship superstructure. In July 1940, he managed to get the destroyer HMS Broke (D83) in which he was serving experimentally camouflaged, differently on the two sides. To starboard, the ship was painted blue-grey all over, but with white in naturally shadowed areas as countershading, following the ideas of Abbott Handerson Thayer from the First World War. To port, the ship was painted in "bright pale colours" to combine some disruption of shape with the ability to fade out during the night, again with shadowed areas painted white. However, he later wrote that compromise was fatal to camouflage, and that invisibility at night (by painting ships in white or other pale colours) had to be the sole objective.

By May 1941, all ships in the Western Approaches (the North Atlantic) were ordered to be painted in Scott's camouflage scheme. The scheme was said to be so effective that several British ships including HMS Broke collided with each other. The effectiveness of Scott's and Thayer's ideas was demonstrated experimentally by the Leamington Camouflage Centre in 1941. Under a cloudy overcast sky, the tests showed that a white ship could approach six miles (9.6 km) closer than a black-painted ship before being seen.

Postwar life

Scott stood as a Conservative in the 1945 general election in Wembley North and narrowly failed to be elected. In 1946, he founded the organisation with which he was ever afterwards closely associated, the Severn Wildfowl Trust (now the Wildfowl and Wetlands Trust) with its headquarters at Slimbridge in Gloucestershire. There, through a captive breeding programme, he saved the nene or Hawaiian goose from extinction in the 1950s. In the years that followed, he led ornithological expeditions worldwide, and became a television personality, popularising the study of wildfowl and wetlands.

His BBC natural history series, Look, ran from 1955 to 1969 and made him a household name. It included the first BBC natural history film to be shown in colour, The Private Life of the Kingfisher (1968), which he narrated. He wrote and illustrated several books on the subject, including his autobiography, The Eye of the Wind (1961). In the 1950s, he also appeared regularly on BBC radio's Children's Hour, in the series, "Nature Parliament".

Scott took up gliding in 1956 and became a British champion in 1963. He was chairman of the British Gliding Association (BGA) for two years from 1968 and was president of the Bristol & Gloucestershire Gliding Club. He was responsible for involving Prince Philip in gliding.

He was the subject of This Is Your Life in 1956 when he was surprised by Eamonn Andrews at the King's Theatre, Hammersmith, London.

As a member of the Species Survival Commission of the International Union for Conservation of Nature, he helped create the Red Data books, the group's lists of endangered species.

Scott was the founder President of the Society of Wildlife Artists and President of the Nature in Art Trust (a role in which his wife Philippa succeeded him). Scott tutored numerous artists including Paul Karslake.

From 1973 to 1983, Scott was Chancellor of the University of Birmingham. In 1979, he was awarded an Honorary Degree (Doctor of Science) from the University of Bath.

Scott continued with his love of sailing, skippering the 12-metre yacht Sovereign in the 1964 challenge for the America's Cup which was held by the United States. Sovereign suffered a whitewash 4–0 defeat in a one-sided competition where the American boat was of a noticeably faster design. From 1955 to 1969 he was the president of The International Yacht Racing Union (now World Sailing).

He was one of the founders of the World Wide Fund for Nature (formerly called the World Wildlife Fund), and designed its panda logo. His pioneering work in conservation also contributed greatly to the shift in policy of the International Whaling Commission and signing of the Antarctic Treaty, the latter inspired by his visit to his father's base on Ross Island in Antarctica.

Scott was a long-time Vice-President of the British Naturalists' Association, whose Peter Scott Memorial Award was instituted after his death, to commemorate his achievements.

He died of a heart attack on 29 August 1989 in Bristol, two weeks before his 80th birthday.

Documentaries
Scott narrated Wild Wings, a 1966 British short documentary film, produced by British  Transport Films. In 1967, it won an Oscar for Best Short Subject at the 39th Academy Awards.

In August 1986, an ITV Special was transmitted by Central Independent Television (Production No.6407) on Scott entitled Interest the Boy in Nature featuring Konrad Lorenz, Prince Philip, David Attenborough and Gerald Durrell; written, produced and directed by Robin Brown.

In 1996 Scott's life and work in wildlife conservation was celebrated in a major BBC Natural World documentary, produced by Andrew Cooper and narrated by Sir David Attenborough. Filmed across three continents from Hawaii to the Russian arctic, In the Eye of the Wind was the BBC Natural History Unit's tribute to Scott and the organisation he founded, the Wildfowl and Wetland Trust, on its 50th anniversary.

In June 2004, Scott and Sir David Attenborough were jointly profiled in the second of a three-part BBC Two series, The Way We Went Wild, about television wildlife presenters and were described as being largely responsible for the way that the British and much of the world view wildlife.

Scott's life was also the subject of a BBC Four documentary called Peter Scott – A Passion for Nature produced in 2006 by Available Light Productions (Bristol).

Loch Ness Monster
In 1962, he co-founded the Loch Ness Phenomena Investigation Bureau with Conservative MP David James, who had previously been Polar Adviser on the 1948 film Scott of the Antarctic, based on his father's polar expedition. In 1975 Scott proposed the scientific name Nessiteras rhombopteryx for the Loch Ness Monster (based on a blurred underwater photograph of a supposed fin) so that it could be registered as an endangered species. The name was based on the Ancient Greek for "monster of Ness with diamond-shaped fin", but it was later pointed out by The Daily Telegraph to be an anagram of "Monster hoax by Sir Peter S".  Robert H. Rines, who took two supposed pictures of the monster in the 1970s, responded by pointing out that the letters could also be read as an anagram for, "Yes, both pix are monsters, R."

Personal life
Scott married the novelist Elizabeth Jane Howard in 1942 and had a daughter, Nicola, born a year later. Howard left Scott in 1946 and they were divorced in 1951.

In 1951, Scott married his assistant, Philippa Talbot-Ponsonby, while on an expedition to Iceland in search of the breeding grounds of the pink-footed goose. A daughter, Dafila, was born later in the same year (dafila is the old scientific name for a pintail). She, too, became an artist, painting birds. A son, Falcon, was born in 1954.

Honours and decorations
On 8 July 1941, it was announced that Scott had been mentioned in despatches "for good services in rescuing survivors from a burning Vessel" while serving on HMS Broke. On 2 October 1942, it was announced that he had been further mentioned in despatches "for gallantry, daring and skill in the combined attack on Dieppe". On 1 June 1943, he was awarded the Distinguished Service Cross (DSC) "for skill and gallantry in action with enemy light forces".

He was appointed Member of the Order of the British Empire (MBE) in the 1942 Birthday Honours. He was promoted to Commander of the Order of the British Empire (CBE) in the 1953 Coronation Honours. He was knighted by Queen Elizabeth II at Buckingham Palace on 27 February 1973. In the 1987 Birthday Honours, he was appointed to the Order of the Companions of Honour (CH) "for services to conservation". In 1987 he was also elected Fellow of the Royal Society.

Legacy
The fish Scotts' wrasse Cirrhilabrus scottorum was named after Peter and Philippa Scott for their “great contribution in nature conservation".

The Peter Scott Walk passes the mouth of the River Nene and follows the old sea bank along The Wash, from Scott's lighthouse near Sutton Bridge in Lincolnshire to the ferry crossing at King's Lynn.

The Sir Peter Scott National Park is located in central Jamnagar, in Gujarat, India.  Jamnagar also has a Sir Peter Scott Bird Hospital. These institutions in Jamnagar were founded as a result of the friendship between Peter Scott and Jam Sahib, the Indian ruler of Jamnagar.

Bibliography
 Morning flight. Country Life, London 1936–44.
 Wild chorus. Country Life, London 1939.
 Through the Air. (with Michael Bratby). Country Life, London 1941.
 The battle of the narrow seas. Country Life, White Lion & Scribners, London, New York 1945–74. 
 Portrait drawings. Country Life, London 1949.
 Key to the wildfowl of the world. Slimbridge 1950.
 Wild geese and Eskimos. Country Life & Scribner, London, New York 1951.
 A thousand geese. Collins, Houghton & Mifflin, London, Boston 1953/54.
 A coloured key to the wildfowl of the world. Royle & Scribner, London, New York 1957–88.
 Wildfowl of the British Isles. Country Life, London 1957.
 The eye of the wind. (autobiography) Hodder, Stoughton & Brockhampton, London, Leicester 1961–77. , 
 Animals in Africa. Potter & Cassell, New York, London 1962–65.
 My favourite stories of wild life. Lutterworth 1965.
 Our vanishing wildlife. Doubleday, Garden City 1966.
 Happy the man. Sphere, London 1967.
 Atlas en couleur des anatidés du monde. Le Bélier-Prisma, Paris 1970.
 The wild swans at Slimbridge. Slimbridge 1970.
 The swans. Joseph, Houghton & Mifflin, London, Boston 1972. 
 The amazing world of animals. Nelson, Sunbury-on-Thames 1976. 
 Observations of wildlife. Phaidon & Cornell, Oxford, Ithaca 1980.
 Travel diaries of a naturalist. Collins, London. 3 vols: 1983, 1985, 1987.
 The crisis of the University. Croom Helm, London 1984. , 
 Conservation of island birds. Cambridge 1985. 
 The art of Peter Scott. Sinclair-Stevenson, London 1992 p. m.

Forewords
 The Red Book – Wildlife in Danger James Fisher, Noel Simon & Jack Vincent, Collins, 1969
 The acknowledgments in this book credit Scott with originating the idea behind it
 George Edward Lodge – Unpublished Bird Paintings C.A. Fleming (Michael Joseph) 1983

Illustrations
 
 Waterfowl of the World – with Jean Delacour, Country Life 1954
 Gallico, Paul (1946), The Snow Goose, Michael Joseph, London. Four full-page colour paintings, plus numerous black-and-white line drawings.

Films
 Wild Wings

Further reading
 The Wild Geese of the Newgrounds by Paul Walkden. Published by the Friends of WWT Slimbridge, 2009. . Illustrated with colour plates and ink drawing by Peter Scott. Includes chronology.
 Peter Scott. Collected Writings 1933–1989. Compiled by Paul Walkden. Published by The Wildfowl & Wetlands Trust 2016. Hardback , E-book . Includes Chronology and Bibliography. Illustrated with photos and b/w illustrations.

References

Autobiography

External links

 Article illustrated with his paintings
 Biography
 
 

1909 births
1989 deaths
English ornithologists
British conservationists
English activists
Cryptozoologists
English television presenters
Wildfowl & Wetlands Trust
English illustrators
20th-century English painters
English male painters
20th-century English writers
Fellows of the Royal Society (Statute 12)
British stamp designers
English male sailors (sport)
Sailors at the 1936 Summer Olympics – O-Jolle
Olympic sailors of Great Britain
Olympic bronze medallists for Great Britain
1964 America's Cup sailors
Members of the Order of the Companions of Honour
Knights Bachelor
Anglo-Scots
Gliding in England
Glider pilots
Chancellors of the University of Birmingham
Rectors of the University of Aberdeen
Alumni of Trinity College, Cambridge
People educated at West Downs School
People educated at Oundle School
English people of Scottish descent
English conservationists
British bird artists
Royal Naval Volunteer Reserve personnel of World War II
Olympic medalists in sailing
Camoufleurs
20th-century British zoologists
Recipients of the Distinguished Service Cross (United Kingdom)
Commanders of the Order of the British Empire
Medalists at the 1936 Summer Olympics
Peter
Presidents of World Sailing
English sports executives and administrators
Military personnel from London
20th-century English male artists